The United States National Strategy for Homeland Security is a formal government response to the events of September 11, 2001 at the Pentagon and World Trade Center. The document issued by President George W. Bush outlines the overall strategic considerations for cooperation between the federal government, states, private enterprises, and ordinary citizens in anticipating future terrorism attacks as well as natural disasters and other incidents of national significance. The National Response Framework is the part of the homeland security national strategy that is a Comprehensive Emergency Management guideline for implementing scalable responses to disasters and other incidents of national significance.

Goals 

The four primary goals of the National Strategy for Homeland Security are:

 Prevent and disrupt terrorist attacks;
 Protect the American people, our critical infrastructure, and key resources;
 Respond to and recover from incidents that do occur; and
 Continue to strengthen the foundation to ensure our long-term success.

The first three goals help to organize national efforts while the last goal entails creating and transforming homeland security principles, systems, structures, and institutions.

Implementation 

One of the first steps in implementing the strategy was the creation of the Department of Homeland Security.

According to the "Homeland Security and National Security" section of the national strategy document:

NIMS/ICS 

Generally, the United States Federal Emergency Management Agency (FEMA) provides local guidance on implementing the National Incident Management System (NIMS) and Incident Command System (ICS) for local handling of emergency responses. As responses use up local resources, state and federal resources are mobilized under the National Response Framework, so that operational priorities are met during emergency responses of increasing size and complexity. All of these response activities are within the overall scope of the National Strategy for Homeland Security, whether emergency incidents are the result of terrorism or failure to respond may cause increased vulnerability to terrorism that may occur later.

References 

 Office of Homeland Security, National Strategy for Homeland Security (October 2007), available at https://www.dhs.gov/national-strategy-homeland-security-october-2007

Notes 

Disaster preparedness in the United States
Emergency management in the United States
United States Department of Homeland Security
2000s in the United States